Tollet is a municipality in the district of Grieskirchen in the Austrian state of Upper Austria.

Geography
Tollet lies in the Hausruckviertel. About 18 percent of the municipality is forest, and 72 percent is farmland.

History
The noble family Jörger von Tollet is named after the village.

References

Cities and towns in Grieskirchen District